Sergei Viktorovich Yegorov (born 13 April 1973) is a Kazakhstani professional football official and a former player. He is the director of sports with FC Khimki. He also holds Russian citizenship.

External links
 

1973 births
People from Temirtau
Living people
Soviet footballers
Kazakhstani footballers
Kazakhstani expatriate footballers
Expatriate footballers in Russia
Russian Premier League players
FC Tekstilshchik Kamyshin players
FC Elista players
FC Baltika Kaliningrad players
FC Anzhi Makhachkala players
FC Shakhter Karagandy players
FC Sodovik Sterlitamak players
Association football midfielders
Association football forwards